Coombs is a small community on Vancouver Island in the Regional District of Nanaimo, British Columbia, situated on provincial highway 4A approximately  west of Parksville.  Coombs is home to approximately 1,327 people and is renowned for its Old Country Market (which features a family of goats living on the roof), Butterfly World (which includes a small indoor tropical rainforest), the 106 year old Coombs Fall Fair and the Coombs Bluegrass Festival held every B.C. Day weekend.
The history of Coombs goes back many years. The Ford House which is the old log house situated on the Alberni Highway is dated back to the early 1900s. The pioneer Walter Ford house was completed in 1911. Next to the Ford House is the Dutch Store since year 2021, prior, 1912 to 2021 it was the old General Store, which also always housed the General Post Office. 
The Coombs Fair Grounds is an active place throughout the year. 
The Rodeo Grounds just up the highway heading towards Port Alberni is a successful and active place during the summer months. The railway line is also a huge part of the history of Coombs. Along with the United Church and just over the French Creek Bridge is the French Creek School, opened in 1912, which closed in 2015 but is used now as a Coombs Community Commons. French Creek school was a huge asset to the community for over 100 years.

The community was established in 1910 under a Salvation Army emigration plan to relocate people from the crowded cities in Great Britain. This new town was named after Commissioner Thomas Bales Coombs, head of the Salvation Army movement in Canada in the early 1900s. Coombs was retiring in 1911 so the Salvation Army honored him by naming the new Vancouver Island colony after him. Commissioner Coombs never visited the Coombs Colony.

Climate
Under the Köppen climate classification, Coombs is located at the northernmost limits of the cool dry-summer subtropical zone (Csb) or cool-summer Mediterranean climate, due to its dry summers.

Gallery

References 

Nature sites
Dudley Marsh

External links

Unincorporated settlements in British Columbia
Populated places in the Regional District of Nanaimo
Designated places in British Columbia
Vancouver Island